Lydia Taft (née Chapin; February 2, 1712November 9, 1778) was the first woman known to legally vote in colonial America. This occurred at a town meeting in the New England town of Uxbridge in Massachusetts Colony, on October 30, 1756.

Early life
Lydia Chapin was born in Mendon, Worcester County, Massachusetts on February 2, 1712. She was the daughter of Seth Chapin and Bethia Thurston. Seth Chapin was a respected member of the community and a captain in the militia. Young Lydia grew up in Mendon, in a large family with nine siblings. Her mother had 14 children. Her father owned much property in what is today Milford, South Hopedale and Posts Lane, Mendon. The family lived on  near the Post's Lane bridge and Mill River.

In 1727, the western part of Mendon became the newly incorporated town of Uxbridge. Mendon and Uxbridge were, at that time, rural communities in central Massachusetts. In 1731, these communities became part of the new county of Worcester County.

By their mutual ancestor, Captain Seth Chapin, she was a great-great-great grand-aunt of the 27th United States President William Howard Taft, also his first cousin, four times removed, by marriage to Josiah Taft.

By their mutual ancestor, Samuel Chapin, was a second cousin, seven times removed, to celebrated songwriters and musicians Harry Chapin and Mary Chapin Carpenter.

Marriage to Josiah Taft
Lydia Chapin was married to Josiah Taft, on December 28, 1731 at the Congregational Church in Mendon. He was born on April 2, 1709. Josiah's father, Daniel, had been a local "squire" and Justice of the Peace. Lydia and Josiah settled in Uxbridge. They had eight children between 1732 and 1753: Josiah (born May 10, 1733), Ebenezer (born somewhere between August 20, 1735 and October 16, 1735), Caleb (born between January 15, 1739 and September  19, 1756), Asahel (born April 23, 1740), Joel (born between August 15, 1742 and February 19, 1747), Joel (born between February 19, 1748 and August 30, 1749), Bazaleel (born November 3, 1750), and Chloe (born June 7, 1753).

Josiah became a prominent citizen in early Uxbridge as a wealthy farmer, local official, and Massachusetts legislator. He served several terms as a member of the Board of Selectmen, as town clerk, as town moderator, and in the Massachusetts General Court (1753).

Place in early American history
Josiah Taft was originally known as Ensign Josiah Taft in the Uxbridge Militia, later as Lieutenant, and then Captain in the French and Indian War. He presided over the proceedings of the New England style open town meeting and became the largest taxpayer in the town of Uxbridge in 1756. In the fall of 1756, Josiah and Lydia's 18-year-old son, Caleb, became ill while studying at Harvard and died on September 19. After traveling to Cambridge to bury Caleb, Josiah himself became ill and died on September 30, at age 47—leaving behind a significant estate. His death was immediately prior to an important vote on the town's support for the French and Indian War. Josiah's untimely death opened the door for Lydia's step into America's history of women's suffrage.

In Colonial America, women were not allowed to vote. Margaret Brent of Maryland Colony tried to assert property rights and to vote in 1647 on behalf of herself and Lord Calvert's estate, but this was denied by the Governor. Over a hundred years would pass before a woman succeeded in voting in an official capacity.

The Uxbridge townspeople allowed Lydia, "the widow Josiah Taft", to vote, because of the landowner and taxpayer status of Josiah's estate and the fact that Bazaleel, Caleb's younger brother, was still a minor. Receiving his proxy, she thus became the first recorded legal woman voter in colonial America when she cast a vote on October 30, 1756 in an official New England Open Town Meeting, at Uxbridge, Massachusetts—as was noted in the records of the Uxbridge Town Meeting. Her vote was in favor of appropriating funds for the regiments engaged in the French and Indian War. Taft's historic vote preceded the constitutional amendment for women's suffrage by 164 years. She appeared at and may have voted at two other official Uxbridge Town meetings, in 1758 and 1765.

Taft died at Uxbridge on November 9, 1778, at the age of 66, during the American Revolution.

Many years later, Judge Henry Chapin proclaimed in an 1864 address to the Unitarian church, that, "Uxbridge may yet become famous as the pioneer in the cause of women's suffrage". According to Chapin, the decision to allow Taft to vote was following the tradition of "no taxation without representation". Chapin's claim for Taft as the first woman voter has been disputed by recent historians. They contend that historical documents do not support Chapin's story of his family's history, which was from a speech delivered over one hundred years after the event.

Nonetheless, Taft's role in the history of women's suffrage has been recognized by the Massachusetts legislature since 2004, when it named Massachusetts Route 146A, from Uxbridge to the Rhode Island border, in her honor.

See also
Taft family
Nineteenth Amendment to the United States Constitution
Women's suffrage in the United States
Feminism in the United States
Timeline of women's suffrage

References

External links

The Chapin Genealogy, p. 226-227
 Photo of Painting: Lydia Chapin Taft Source:Find a grave

French and Indian War
1712 births
1778 deaths
People from Mendon, Massachusetts
People from Uxbridge, Massachusetts
People of colonial Massachusetts
Taft family
Women's suffrage in the United States